Pyronaridine is an antimalarial drug. It was first made in 1970 and has been in clinical use in China since the 1980s.

In a small (n=88) malaria study in Camaroon, pyronaridine had a 100% cure rate, compared with 60% for chloroquine.

It is one of the components of the artemisinin combination therapy pyronaridine/artesunate (Pyramax).

It has also been studied as a potential anticancer drug, and treatment for Ebola. The combination of pyronaridine and artesunate has been evaluated to have a synergistic effect of stronger antiviral effect and less toxicity. The combination of pyronaridine and artesunate is being studied as a possible treatment for moderate to severe SARS-COV-2.

References 

Antimalarial agents
Chinese discoveries